Zabid District is a district of the Al Hudaydah Governorate in western Yemen.

Overview
The Yemeni Sufi Sheikh Isma'il al-Jabarti of the Qadiriyyah order is buried in the Zabid District. The father of Sheikh Abdirahman bin Isma'il al-Jabarti (Darod), the progenitor of the Somali Darod clan, Isma'il al-Jabarti's tomb is situated in the ancient local town of Bab Siham. His grave is a popular place of pilgrimage.

Demographics
As of 2003, the district had a population of 155,585 inhabitants.

References

Districts of Al Hudaydah Governorate